Shona Bondhu is a 2017 Bangladeshi drama film directed by Jahangir Alam Sumon and the film stars D A Tayeb, Pori Moni and Sadika Parvin Popy and many more. It was one of two films shortlisted as the Bangladeshi entry for the Best Foreign Language Film at the 90th Academy Awards, but it lost out to Khacha.

Cast
 D A Tayeb
 Pori Moni
 Sadika Parvin Popy

Soundtrack

References

External links
 

2017 films
2017 drama films
Bengali-language Bangladeshi films
Bangladeshi drama films
2010s Bengali-language films